José Manuel Eguiguren Urrejola (1811–1883) was a Chilean politician and lawyer. He was born in Cauquenes in 1811 and died in Santiago in 1883. He was the son of Don José Manuel de Eguiguren Uriarte and Doña María Josefa Urrejola de Lecler y Vicourt. He married María Concepción Gaete Ruiz.

Education
Urrejola attended the local school in Cauquenes and later emigrated to Santiago, where he studied law at the National Institute, graduating as a lawyer in 1843.

Legal career
Urrejola worked as a lawyer for the Municipality of Santiago from 1845. He next served as collector of Customs in Valparaiso from 1848 and then later was appointed Judge in Cauquenes from 1850.

Political career
Urrejola was a Conservative Party activist and thus was elected Member of Parliament for Curicó and Santa Cruz in 1855. He was re-elected to the same departments in 1858. During this period he joined the Standing Committee on Constitution, Law and Justice.

In 1862 he was appointed Minister of the Court of Appeals of Santiago and then Minister of the Supreme Court of Justice in 1867. Later he retired from public life and took over the running of his family ranch.

References 

1811 births
1883 deaths
People from Cauquenes
Chilean people of Basque descent
Conservative Party (Chile) politicians
Members of the Chamber of Deputies of Chile
Instituto Nacional General José Miguel Carrera alumni
19th-century Chilean lawyers